"Who Needs You" is a song by Chicago-based indie rock band The Orwells. The song was released in 2014 as the lead single from the band's second album, Disgraceland. The song was released as a single in 2013 but charted in 2014. Also, this song can be heard in the video game Grand Theft Auto V on the radio station Vinewood Boulevard Radio, and also in the video games Guitar Hero Live and Tony Hawk's Pro Skater 5. This song was also used in a 2014 Apple ad for the iPad Air 2

Chart performance
The song was the first song by the band to chart, where it charted in three Billboard charts. It reached number 23 on the Alternative Songs chart. The song remained in the Alternative Songs charts for 11 weeks. The song also charted in the Hot Rock Songs, Rock Airplay and Rock Digital Songs charts, reaching number 46, 48, and 49, respectively.

Charts

Release history

References

2013 songs
2013 singles
Atlantic Records singles
The Orwells songs